Reminiscence is a 2021 American neo-noir science fiction thriller film written, directed, and produced by Lisa Joy in her feature directorial debut. The film stars Hugh Jackman, Rebecca Ferguson, Thandiwe Newton, Cliff Curtis, Marina de Tavira, and Daniel Wu, and follows a man who uses a machine that can see people's memories to try to find his missing love. Joy also produces alongside her husband and creative partner Jonathan Nolan.

Reminiscence was released by Warner Bros. Pictures in the United States on August 20, 2021, and also had a month-long simultaneous release in the country on the ad-free tier of the HBO Max streaming service. The film received mixed reviews from critics, who praised its narrative ambition but compared it unfavorably to similarly themed works like The Maltese Falcon and Westworld. It was a box office bomb, grossing $16 million worldwide against a $54 million budget.

Plot
In the near future, climate change has caused the seas to rise and flood Miami. Extreme daytime temperatures have forced most of the population to live at night.

Nick Bannister and his friend Watts operate a business that allows people to relive memories. One day, a walk-in client, Mae, asks for their help finding her missing keys. Nick is instantly attracted to her; observing her memories of that evening, he learns she is a nightclub singer and feels a connection with her when she sings his favorite song, "Where or When". Nick and Mae begin a relationship, although Watts distrusts her.

Months later, Mae has disappeared without a word. Hoping to find a clue to her whereabouts, Nick spends hours repeatedly reliving his memories of their relationship, a dangerous practice that could forever trap him in the memory.

Prosecutor Avery Castillo hires Nick and Watts to retrieve memories from a comatose suspect who worked for a drug kingpin named Saint Joe in New Orleans. In the man's memories, Nick sees that Mae was once Saint Joe's mistress and had become addicted to "Baca," a highly addictive narcotic. The memories also reveal that Mae stole Saint Joe's stash of Baca before fleeing town. Nick is devastated to learn that Mae was an addict, something that Watts already knew.

Nick travels to New Orleans and confronts Saint Joe, who says he has heard nothing from Mae since she left him. Saint Joe has his men try to drown Nick, but Watts rescues him and kills Saint Joe and his crew. Back in Miami, Nick has Watts relive her last encounter with Mae, and discovers Mae broke into the vault where they store recordings of their clients' memories. They discover Mae stole recordings of Elsa Carine, a client who repeatedly relived her trysts with an older, wealthy lover. Nick recognizes the voice of her lover as Walter Sylvan, a wealthy "land baron" who has recently died.

Investigating, Nick learns that Elsa was recently murdered and her young son was kidnapped by a woman who matches Mae's description. While searching for Mae, Nick is attacked by Cyrus Boothe, a former henchman of Saint Joe. Realizing that Elsa's son was likely the child of Walter Sylvan and thus a potential heir to his fortune, Nick confronts Sylvan's widow, Tamara, a former client whose memory has been damaged. In a moment of lucidity, Tamara points Nick to a place where Boothe and Mae could be hiding. Nick and Boothe fight, with Boothe almost drowning before Nick can subdue him. Nick takes Boothe back to his office and hooks him up to the machine to view his memories.

Boothe's memories reveal that the basis of Mae's relationship with Nick was a lie: after Boothe enlisted her in a plan to con Nick, she researched Nick to learn how to seduce him better and staged the loss of her keys. But the memories also show that Mae came to genuinely love Nick. When Boothe murdered Elsa, Mae took Elsa's son and fled, stashing him at an unknown location. Later, Boothe found Mae and tried to force her to reveal the child's location.

Nick watches the memory as Mae delivers a speech to Boothe, which is actually meant for him. She indirectly reveals the location of Elsa's son and professes her love for Nick. Then, seeing only one way out of her situation, Mae takes a lethal dose of Baca and jumps off a balcony to her death.

Devastated, Nick forces Boothe to relive his worst memory: when Saint Joe's men burned his face as punishment for skimming profits. He confronts Sylvan's legitimate son Sebastian, who hired Boothe to eliminate Elsa and his half-brother to protect his inheritance. Sebastian almost commits suicide, but he changes his mind and is arrested.

Nick confesses to Watts that he intentionally "burned" Boothe's memories, a major crime. He is convicted and allowed to serve his sentence using his machine to relive his time with Mae, which is implied to be the rest of his life. In his memory, Nick recounts to Mae a shortened version of the story of Orpheus and Eurydice, ending with the lovers reunited and happy, before the story's usual conclusion.

Cast

Production
In 2013, Lisa Joy's screenplay for the film ended up on The Black List, an annual survey of the most popular screenplays that had not yet been produced. According to the survey, which polled over 250 film executives, her screenplay received twenty votes for "best" screenplay. In January 2019, it was announced that Joy would be making her directorial debut with the film, which would star Hugh Jackman and Rebecca Ferguson. In March 2019, it was reported that Warner Bros. had bought distribution rights to the film. In August, Thandiwe Newton was added to the cast. Daniel Wu, Angela Sarafyan, Natalie Martinez, Marina de Tavira and Cliff Curtis joined in October. Filming began on October 21, 2019, in New Orleans and Miami. In August 2020, Newton's daughter Nico Parker was also revealed to have been in the cast.

Release
Reminiscence was released by Warner Bros. Pictures in the United States on August 20, 2021. It premiered at BFI IMAX on August 11, 2021. As part of its plans for all of its 2021 titles, Warner Bros. will also stream the film simultaneously on the HBO Max service in the United States for a period of one month, after which the film was removed until the normal home media release schedule period. According to Samba TV, an estimated 842,000 households streamed the film over its first three days. By the end of its first month, the film had been watched in over 2 million U.S. households. The film was re-added to HBO Max on January 29, 2022.

Reminiscence was originally scheduled to be released on April 16, 2021, before the slot was replaced by Mortal Kombat and the film was left undated, due to the COVID-19 pandemic. It was later rescheduled to be released theatrically in the United States on September 3, 2021, with an international theatrical rollout beginning on August 25, 2021. The release date in the United States was then moved up to August 27 to avoid competition with Shang-Chi and the Legend of the Ten Rings, and then again to August 20.

Reception

Box office 
Reminiscence grossed $3.9 million in the United States and Canada, and $12.5 million in other territories, for a worldwide total of $16.4 million. Variety estimated the film needed to gross around $110 million in order to break even.

In the United States and Canada, Reminiscence was released alongside PAW Patrol: The Movie, The Protégé, and The Night House as well as the limited release of Flag Day and was projected to gross around $3 million from 3,184 theaters in its opening weekend. The film made $675,000 on its first day and went on to debut to $2 million, finishing ninth at the box office. It was the worst opening of all-time by a film playing in over 3,000 theaters, passing The Rhythm Sections $2.7 million debut in January 2020. The film fell 59% in its second weekend to $792,408.

Critical response 
On review aggregator Rotten Tomatoes, the film holds an approval rating of 36% based on 198 reviews with an average rating of 5.1/10. The website's critics consensus reads: "Although Reminiscence isn't lacking narrative ambition, its uncertain blend of sci-fi action and noir thriller mostly provokes memories of better films." On Metacritic, the film has a weighted average score of 46 out of 100 based on 43 critics, indicating "mixed or average reviews". Audiences polled by CinemaScore gave the film an average grade of "C+" on an A+ to F scale, while PostTrak reported 67% of audience members gave it a positive score, with 44% saying they would definitely recommend it.

Writing for Variety, Owen Gleiberman called the film "a perfectly calibrated two-hour mirage of things we've seen before" and said that, "it's very Blade Runner: The Streaming Series, with maybe a stray hint of The Godfather. Outside, the flooded Miami landscape, with buildings and byways still visible, evokes a kind of Waterworld Lite crossed with a Hunger Games sequel." Richard Roeper of the Chicago Sun-Times gave the film 2 out of 4 stars, and wrote "It's The Maltese Falcon meets Inception somewhere in the Vanilla Sky on the way to Chinatown in the inventive and ambitious but wildly convoluted and ultimately disappointing sci-fi noir Reminiscence, which careens this way and that, and this way and that, before running off the rails."

Writing for The Playlist, Nick Allen gave the film a B+, calling it a "gem" that's "packed with intellectual and emotional thrills." He also praised Jackman and Ferguson's performances, noting that Ferguson has been "ramping up for a role just like this."

See also
List of directorial debuts

References

External links
 
 

2021 science fiction films
2021 thriller films
2021 directorial debut films
2020s science fiction thriller films
American neo-noir films
American science fiction thriller films
FilmNation Entertainment films
Films about memory
Films impacted by the COVID-19 pandemic
Films produced by Michael De Luca
Films set in the future
Films set in Miami
Films set in New Orleans
Films shot in Miami
Films shot in New Orleans
HBO Max films
Warner Bros. films
Works by Lisa Joy
Climate change films
2020s English-language films
2020s American films